Mullah Nisar Ahmad Nusrat is an Afghan Taliban politician who is currently serving as Governor of Kunduz Province since 7 November 2021. He has also served as Governor of Baghlan from August 2021 to 6 November 2021

References

Living people
Taliban governors
Governors of Kunduz Province
Governors of Baghlan Province
Year of birth missing (living people)